Peter Green may refer to:

Musicians
 Peter Green (musician) (1946–2020), English guitarist, founder of Fleetwood Mac
 Daniel Boone (singer) or Peter Green (born 1942), British singer

Sports
 Peter Green (footballer) (born 1974), Australian rules footballer
 Peter Green (referee) (born 1978), Australian association football referee
 Peter Green (rower) (1920–2011), Canadian rower
 Pete Green (baseball) (1891–1961), American Negro leagues baseball player
 Pete Green (ice hockey) (1868–1934), Canadian ice hockey coach

Other people
 Peter Green (dog handler) (fl. 1960s–2010s), dog show handler and judge
 Peter Green (historian) (born 1924), British historian and translator
 Peter Green (physician) (born 1947), Australian-born gastroenterologist
 Peter Green (statistician) (born 1950), English statistician
 Peter F. Green, American materials scientist
 Peter Shaw Green (1920–2009), English botanist

Other uses
 Peter Green (shop), a British furniture retailer

See also
 Peter Greene (born 1965), American actor 
 Peter Greene (politician) (1895–1963), mayor of Galway
 Petey Greene (1931–1984), American talk show host

Green, Peter